The Oakland Athletics (the A's) are a Major League Baseball (MLB) franchise based in Oakland, California. They play in the American League West division. The Athletics had played in Philadelphia from 1901 to 1954 and then Kansas City from 1955 to 1967 before moving to Oakland. Since the establishment of the Rule 4 Draft the Athletics have selected 82 players in the first round. Officially known as the "First-Year Player Draft", the Rule 4 Draft is MLB's primary mechanism for assigning players from high schools, colleges, and other amateur clubs to its franchises. The draft order is determined based on the previous season's standings, with the team possessing the worst record receiving the first pick. In addition, teams which lost free agents in the previous off-season may be awarded compensatory or supplementary picks.

Of these 82 players, 36 have been pitchers, the most of any position; 27 of these were right-handed, while 9 were left-handed. Fifteen outfielders, including one center fielder, and 14 shortstops were selected. The A's have also drafted seven catchers, five third basemen, four first basemen, and one second baseman in the first round. Additionally, 23 players came from high schools or universities in the A's home state of California, followed by 10 from Texas and Florida. They also drafted Ariel Prieto in 1995, who had defected from Cuba the year before. Prieto made his major league debut in 1995, one of 20 players in draft history to go directly to the majors without playing in the minor leagues.

Three Athletics' first-round picks have won championships with the franchise. Reggie Jackson (1966) won World Series titles with the team in 1972, 1973, and 1974. Mark McGwire (1984) and Walt Weiss (1985) won with the 1989 championship team. Four A's first-round picks have gone on to win the Rookie of the Year Award: McGwire in 1987, Weiss in 1988, Ben Grieve (1994) in 1998, and Huston Street (2004) in 2005. Jackson also won a Most Valuable Player award in 1973, and Barry Zito (1999) won a Cy Young Award in 2002, making them the A's only picks to win these awards. Reggie Jackson, elected in 1993, is their only pick in the Baseball Hall of Fame. Although eligible McGwire has not been elected despite over 500 career home runs and briefly holding the single-season home run record (70). Some see McGwire's exclusion as a sign that the Hall is hesitant to elect players suspected of using performance-enhancing drugs as McGwire was suspected of steroid use (he later admitted his use in 2010). The Athletics have made nineteen selections in the supplemental round of the draft and have made the first overall selection once: in the first draft in 1965.

The Athletics have failed to sign three first-round draft picks, although they did not receive a compensation pick for any of them. The first such player not signed was Pete Broberg in 1968. The A's also failed to sign both of their draft picks in 1979, Juan Bustabad and Mike Stenhouse. The Athletics have had ten compensatory picks overall since the first draft in 1965. These additional picks are provided when a team loses a particularly valuable free agent in the previous off-season, or, more recently, if a team fails to sign a draft pick from the previous year.

Key

Picks

See also
Oakland Athletics minor league players

Footnotes
 Through the 2012 draft, free agents were evaluated by the Elias Sports Bureau and rated "Type A", "Type B", or not compensation-eligible. If a team offered arbitration to a player but that player refused and subsequently signed with another team, the original team was able to receive additional draft picks. If a "Type A" free agent left in this way, his previous team received a supplemental pick and a compensatory pick from the team with which he signed. If a "Type B" free agent left in this way, his previous team received only a supplemental pick. Since the 2013 draft, free agents are no longer classified by type; instead, compensatory picks are only awarded if the team offered its free agent a contract worth at least the average of the 125 current richest MLB contracts. However, if the free agent's last team acquired the player in a trade during the last year of his contract, it is ineligible to receive compensatory picks for that player.
The Athletics gained a compensatory first-round pick in 1978 from the Texas Rangers as compensation for losing free agent Mike Jorgensen.
The Athletics gained a compensatory first-round pick in 1979 from the Boston Red Sox as compensation for losing free agent Steve Renko.
The Athletics lost their first-round pick in 1982 to the Boston Red Sox as compensation for signing free agent Joe Rudi.
The Athletics lost their first-round pick in 1989 to the Seattle Mariners as compensation for signing free agent Mike Moore.
The Athletics gained a compensatory first-round pick in 1990 from the Milwaukee Brewers as compensation for losing free agent Dave Parker.
The Athletics gained a supplemental first-round pick in 1990 for losing free agent Storm Davis.
The Athletics gained a supplemental first-round pick in 1990 for losing free agent Dave Parker.
The Athletics gained a supplemental first-round pick in 1991 for losing free agent Willie McGee.
The Athletics gained a supplemental first-round pick in 1993 for losing free agent Dave Stewart.
The Athletics gained a compensatory first-round pick in 1997 from the Baltimore Orioles as compensation for losing free agent Mike Bordick.
The Athletics gained a supplemental first-round pick in 1997 for losing free agent Mike Bordick.
The Athletics gained a supplemental first-round pick in 1997 for losing free agent Mike Bordick.
The Athletics lost their first-round pick in 2000 to the Los Angeles Angels of Anaheim as compensation for signing free agent Mike Magnante.
The Athletics gained a compensatory first-round pick in 2001 from the New York Mets as compensation for losing free agent Kevin Appier.
The Athletics gained a supplemental first-round pick in 2001 for losing free agent Kevin Appier.
The Athletics gained a compensatory first-round pick in 2002 from the Boston Red Sox as compensation for losing free agent Johnny Damon.
The Athletics gained a compensatory first-round pick in 2002 from the New York Yankees as compensation for losing free agent Jason Giambi.
The Athletics gained a compensatory first-round pick in 2002 from the St. Louis Cardinals as compensation for losing free agent Jason Isringhausen.
The Athletics gained a supplemental first-round pick in 2002 for losing free agent Jason Giambi.
The Athletics gained a supplemental first-round pick in 2002 for losing free agent Jason Isringhausen.
The Athletics gained a supplemental first-round pick in 2002 for losing free agent Johnny Damon.
The Athletics gained a compensatory first-round pick in 2003 from the San Francisco Giants as compensation for losing free agent Ray Durham.
The Athletics gained a supplemental first-round pick in 2003 for losing free agent Ray Durham.
The Athletics gained a compensatory first-round pick in 2004 from the Boston Red Sox as compensation for losing free agent Keith Foulke.
The Athletics gained a supplemental first-round pick in 2004 for losing free agent Keith Foulke.
The Athletics gained a supplemental first-round pick in 2004 for losing free agent Miguel Tejada.
The Athletics gained a supplemental first-round pick in 2005 for losing free agent Damian Miller.
The Athletics lost their first-round pick in 2006 to the Washington Nationals as compensation for losing free agent Esteban Loaiza.
The Athletics gained a supplemental first-round pick in 2007 for losing free agent Frank Thomas.
The Athletics gained a supplemental first-round pick in 2007 for losing free agent Barry Zito.
The Athletics gained a supplemental first-round pick in 2007 for losing free agent Josh Willingham.
The Athletics gained a supplemental first-round pick in 2007 for losing free agent David DeJesus.
The Athletics gained a supplemental first-round pick in 2016 in Competitive Balance Round A.
The Athletics gained a supplemental first-round pick in 2017 in Competitive Balance Round A.

References
General references

In-text citations

First-round draft picks
Major League Baseball first-round draft picks